Elene Gokieli (25 August 1918 – 31 December 1992) was a Georgian hurdler. She competed in the women's 80 metres hurdles at the 1952 Summer Olympics. Gokieli was affiliated with Dynamo Tbilisi.

References

1918 births
1992 deaths
Athletes (track and field) at the 1952 Summer Olympics
Female hurdlers from Georgia (country)
Soviet female hurdlers
Olympic athletes of the Soviet Union
Sportspeople from Tbilisi
Honoured Masters of Sport of the USSR
Dynamo sports society athletes
Lesgaft National State University of Physical Education, Sport and Health alumni